In music, Op. 52 stands for Opus number 52. Compositions that are assigned this number include:

 Brahms – Liebeslieder Walzer
 Britten – Winter Words
 Chopin – Ballade No. 4
 Mendelssohn – Lobgesang
 Reger – Three chorale fantasias, Op. 52
 Roussel – Sinfonietta
 Schubert – Ave Maria
 Schumann – Overture, Scherzo and Finale
 Sibelius – Symphony No. 3
 Strauss – Taillefer
 Tchaikovsky – All-Night Vigil